Catherine Shepherd is an English comedic actress, writer and director.

Career
In the early 2000s Shepherd appeared in several BBC Radio 4 comedies, as Daisy in the sitcom Think the Unthinkable alongside Marcus Brigstocke and David Mitchell, as Xanthe in Ring Around the Bath, and in James Cary's Radio 4 sketch show Concrete Cow, with Robert Webb.

On television, she played the character April in the sitcom Peep Show. She appeared in one episode of the second series in 2004, and returned eleven years later as a recurring character in series 9.

She appeared as Jessica in The IT Crowd episode "The Dinner Party" (first broadcast 14 September 2007). She appeared in The Peter Serafinowicz Show which aired between 2007 and 2008, where she played multiple roles in the different sketches in the show.

In 2012, Shepherd appeared as Vicky Long in the final episode, "Loose Ends", of the BBC comedy show about the 2012 Olympic Games, Twenty Twelve (first broadcast 24 July 2012). In 2013, Shepherd narrated the audiobook Blue Sky Thinking by Ben Lewis. In October 2018, Shepherd played the title role in the HBO/Sky Atlantic sitcom Sally4Ever.

In 2019, she appeared in the BBC Comedy Short, Sorry, alongside Lolly Adefope.

References

External links 

IMDB

20th-century births
21st-century English actresses
21st-century English writers
Audiobook narrators
English radio actresses
English television actresses
English television directors
Living people
Place of birth missing (living people)
Year of birth missing (living people)
British women television directors